The Front Flying Clasp of the Luftwaffe was a World War II German military decoration awarded to aircrew and certain other Luftwaffe personnel in recognition of the number of operational flights flown. It was instituted by Reichsmarschall Hermann Göring on 30 January 1941. It was awarded in Bronze, Silver, and Gold with an upgrade to include diamonds possible. Pennants suspended from the clasp indicated the number of missions obtained in a given type of aircraft. Front Flying Clasps were issued for missions completed in the following Luftwaffe aircraft:

Day Fighters 
Night Fighters 
Long Range Night Fighters 
Heavy Fighters
Air to Ground Support Fighters 
Bombers 
Reconnaissance 
Transport and Glider

The different clasps were inaugurated on:
30 January 1941 for the Front Flying Clasp
26 June 1942 for the Pennant to the Gold Front Flying Clasp
29 April 1944 for the Pennant with number of mission

Design

All badges are formed of a central device (usually blackened) encircled by a wreath of laurel leaves set between two stylized wings of oak leaves with a swastika located at the base of the wreath. The various designs of the central device was determined from the type of aircraft flown. The clasp pennant was instituted as additional recognition for the increased number of operational missions/flights, which grew as the war continued. As part of the post-war program of the German Denazification, in 1957 these clasps were made available for wear with their Swastika emblems removed.

Criteria for qualification
 Bronze - 20 flown missions
 Silver - 60 flown missions
 Gold - 110 flown missions

Pennant to the Gold Front Flying Clasp
Day Fighters and Transport Units: 500 missions
Air to Ground Support Fighters: 400 missions
Bombers, Air Sea Rescue and Weather Reconnaissance: 300 missions
Reconnaissance and Night Fighters: 250 missions

Notes

References 

Awards established in 1941
Military awards and decorations of Nazi Germany
1941 establishments in Germany
Luftwaffe
Hermann Göring